NA-14 Mansehra-cum-Torghar is a constituency for the National Assembly of Pakistan. It covers part of the district of Mansehra and the entire district of Torghar. The constituency was formerly known as NA-21 (Mansehra-II) from 1977 to 2018 which covered the same area, Torghar being part of Mansehra district until 2011. The name changed to NA-14 (Mansehra-cum-Torghar) after the delimitation in 2018.

Members of Parliament

1977–2002: NA-21 Mansehra-II

2002–2018: NA-21 Mansehra-II

2018-2022: NA-14 Mansehra-cum-Torghar

Detailed results

2002 general election

A total of 1,836 votes were rejected.

2008 general election

2013 general election

A total of 5,660 votes were rejected.

2018 general election 

General elections were held on 25 July 2018.

†JI and JUI-F contested as part of MMA

See also
NA-14 Mansehra-I
NA-16 Abbottabad-I

References

External links 
Election result's official website

14
14